Namhyeon  or Namhyeon-dong is a statutory division of Gwanak District, Seoul, South Korea. Its name means "southern mountain pass". It is named because there was main mountain pass to pass over Mt. Gwanak in the past.

Points of interest
 Seoul Museum of Art, South Branch (SeMA Nam-Seoul)

See also 
Administrative divisions of South Korea

References

External links
Official website
Map of the area at the official website

Neighbourhoods of Gwanak-gu